Apollon Patras B.C., named after the Greek God Apollo, is a Greek professional basketball club that is located in Patras, Greece. Apollon Patras B.C. is the men's basketball club of the Greek multi sports athletic union A.S. Apollon Patras. The club's name sponsorship is Apollon Patras B.C. Carna. Currently, Apollon competes in the Greek Basket League, which is the 1st-tier level basketball division in Greece.

History

The club's parent athletic club, A.S. Apollon Patras, was founded in 1926. The club's men's basketball section, Apollon Patras B.C., was founded in the year 1947. Apollon Patras B.C. has competed in the top division Greek Basket League, in a total of 32 different seasons so far, being one of the constant teams in the Greek League's top division over the years.

The club competed in the top division for the first time in the 1971–72 season. Apollon won the local Achaea regional tournament 4 times, in the years 1956, 1958, 1971, and 1973.

In the 1996–97 season, Apollon B.C. had one of its most successful seasons, finishing in the 7th place of the Greek League, and reaching the Round of 16 at the Saporta Cup. The club also made it to the final of the Greek Cup, for the first time in its history, but they were defeated by Olympiacos. In that particular season, Olympiacos had what is considered to be one of the greatest teams in European basketball history, as they had won the 1997 Triple Crown.

One more successful season followed in the 1997–98 season, in which Apollon finished in the 6th place of the Greek League, and made it to the Saporta Cup Round of 32. The following year (1998–99), the team was relegated down to the Greek A2 Basket League (Greek 2nd Division).

In 2003, Apollon B.C. won the Greek Second Division championship, and subsequently returned to the Greek first division for four straight seasons (2004 to 2007). The team was relegated to the second division again after the 2006–07 season, and returned to the top division Greek Basket League in the 2012–13 season. In that season, Apollon made the league's playoffs, and finished in 8th place in the league's final standings.

Apollon played in the 2015 Greek Cup Final, where they lost to Panathinaikos, by a score of 68–53.

Apollon Patras in international competitions

Arenas

Apollon Patras plays its home games at the 3,500 seat Apollon Patras Indoor Hall. They have also played home games at the Dimitris Tofalos Arena, which can seat 4,200.

Titles and honours
National competitions: (4×)
Greek 2nd Division (4×): 1976,1979,1992,2003
Greek B League (2×): 1976,1979
Greek A2 League (3×): 1992,2003,2021

Local competitions: (4×)
Achaia Regional Championship (4×): 1956, 1958, 1971, 1973 

National honours:
Greek Cup Finalist (2×): 1997, 2015
Greek Basket League Playoff Appearances (8×): 1988, 1989, 1990, 1996, 1997, 1998, 2013, 2014

European honours:
FIBA Saporta Cup: Round of 16 (1997), eliminated by Türk Telekom (140–155)
FIBA Saporta Cup: Round of 32 (1998), eliminated by Hapoel Eilat (173–180)
FIBA Korać Cup: Round of 16 (1999), eliminated by JDA Dijon (122–135)

Apollon Patras' season by season rankings
Bold indicates seasons in which the club made the Greek top-tier level league's playoffs.
Italics indicates seasons in which the club competed in levels below the Greek top-tier level.

Roster

Depth chart

Notable players

Head coaches

Sponsorships
Great Shirt Sponsor: LOUX
Official Sport Clothing Manufacturer: Nickan
Great Sponsor: Oscar

References

External links
Official Website 
Eurobasket.com Team Profile

  
1947 establishments in Greece
Basketball teams established in 1947
Basketball teams in Greece
Sport in Patras